The Day of the Owl is a crime novel about the Sicilian Mafia by Leonardo Sciascia, finished in 1960 and published in 1961.

As the author wrote in his preface of the 1972 Italian edition, the novel was written at a time in which the existence of the Mafia itself was debated and often denied. Its publishing led to widespread debate and to renewed awareness of the phenomenon.

The novel is inspired by the assassination of Accursio Miraglia, a communist trade unionist, at Sciacca in January 1947. Damiano Damiani directed a movie adaptation in 1968.

Sciascia used this story as refutation against the Mafia and the corruption, apparent to his eyes, that led all the way to Rome.

Plot
In a small Sicilian town, early on a Saturday morning, a bus is about to leave the small  to head to the marketplace in the next town nearby. The passengers and bus driver deny having seen the murderer.

A Carabinieri captain and former Civil War partisan from Parma, Bellodi, gets on the case, ruffling feathers in his contemporaries and colleagues alike. Soon he discovers a link that does not stop in Sicily, but goes onwards towards Rome and Minister Mancuso and Senator Livigno, to whom, he discovers, most suspects (including the local boss Don Mariano Arena) are linked.

It seems that the man shot, Salvatore Colasberna, was the owner of a small construction company. Although his company was only a very small one, the local Mafia decides to make an example of him and has him killed.

Using faintly corrupt methods, Bellodi has one man (Diego "Zecchinetta" Marchica) arrested and uses the names given by an informer (Calogero Dibella, known as "Parrinieddu"), who is killed in retaliation, to arrest another (Rosario Pizzuco), who has money stashed away in many bank accounts that add up to more than his fallow fields would ever bring. He is attempting to take down an organization with many members involved in the police and government, and whose mere existence many Sicilians deny. He deliberately ignores the  lead, which is often a handy excuse for Mafia killings.

The death of eyewitness Paolo Nicolosi leads to the collapse of the case against all three, which sees Bellodi taken off the case. The novel ends with Bellodi recounting his time in Sicily to his friends in Parma—who think that it all sounds very romantic—and thinking that he would return to Sicily even if it killed him.

Availability
The English-language translation of The Day of the Owl is available in paperback under  (New York: NYRB Classics, 2003).

Film adaptation
The novel was adapted into the film of the same name in 1968 by Damiano Damiani, starring Franco Nero as Captain Bellodi and Claudia Cardinale as Rosa Nicolosi. The film does take some liberties when compared to the novel, but overall maintains the same message.

1961 novels
Novels by Leonardo Sciascia
Novels about the Sicilian Mafia
Italian novels adapted into films